The 2001–02 season saw Dunfermline Athletic compete in the Scottish Premier League where they finished in 6th position with 45 points.

Final league table

Results
Dunfermline Athletic's score comes first

Legend

Scottish Premier League

Scottish Cup

Scottish League Cup

References

External links
 Dunfermline Athletic 2001–02 at Soccerbase.com (select relevant season from dropdown list)

Dunfermline Athletic F.C. seasons
Dunfermline Athletic